Toha Ri Airport(도하리비행장) is an airport in Hwanghae-bukto, North Korea.

Facilities 
The airfield has a single grass runway 09/27 measuring 2400 x 171 feet (732 x 52 m).

References 

Airports in North Korea